His Royal Highness is a 1932 Australian musical film directed by F. W. Thring, also known as His Loyal Highness (Australia alternative title and title in the United Kingdom), starring George Wallace in his feature film debut. It was the first Australian film musical.

Plot
Tommy Dodds (George Wallace) is a stage hand who has a crush on Molly. He is knocked unconscious and dreams he is the King of Betonia. He scandalises the court by gambling with footmen and teaching his Prime Minister to roller skate, and uncovers a conspiracy by Torano and Yoiben.

The rightful heir to the throne is discovered and Tommy is no longer king. He wakes up from his dream and sees that Molly is interested in someone else.

Cast

Original Play

The film was based on a stage show of two acts and seven scenes which Wallace had written and appeared in the 1920s. It was one of a series of "revusicals" written by Wallace during this period.

Plot
Tommy Dodd is discovered working at a New York pie stall by Alfam and Torano from the European kingdom of Betonia. They are looking for the missing heir to the throne and decide Tommy is it. They ship him off to Betonia, which is located on the Adriatic, where he is acclaimed heir. He is placed under the control of Yioben, an elderly female charged with training him in the royal ways. Tommy eventually discovers that he is not the true heir and another member of court is. He leaves Betonia, but with enough money to buy his own pie stall.

Production
Wallace collaborated on the script with C. J. Dennis. Filming began in February 1932.  It was shot at Efftee's studio at His Majesty's Theatre in Melbourne. The set of the royal palace in Betonia cost £7,000.

Donalda Warne was an emerging stage star, who soon afterwards went to Britain to seek fame. Composer Alaric Howitt was from Melbourne but had recently spent two years working in America.

Raymond Longford later claimed he worked on the movie.

Reception
Despite some unenthusiastic reviews the film was a popular success at the box office, launching George Wallace as a film star.

Thring sold the film to Britain along with Diggers (1931) and The Sentimental Bloke (1932) and some shorts for £100,000. Of these, His Royal Highness proved the most popular in Britain, where it was widely screened, in reportedly over 1000 cinemas. It also received good reviews from the English trade papers, which had previously been critical of On Our Selection. It also enjoyed more popularity at the box office.

After World War II Pat Hanna bought the rights to distribute this and some other Efftee films and enjoyed some success.

Filmink magazine later said "it's a movie of its time and the musical numbers are fairly ropey but Wallace's tremendous talent remains evident."

References

Fitzpatrick, Peter, The Two Frank Thrings, Monash University, 2012

External links

His Royal Highness at National Film and Sound Archive
His Royal Highness at Oz Movies
His Royal Highness at Australian Screen Online
His Royal Highness at AustLit
His Royal Highness at Australian Variety Theatre Archive
Complete script at National Archives of Australia

1932 films
Australian black-and-white films
Australian musical comedy films
1932 musical comedy films
Films directed by F. W. Thring
Films set in Australia
Australian films based on plays
Films set in Europe
1930s Australian films
1930s English-language films